Namibia competed at the 2019 African Games held from 19 to 31 August 2019 in Rabat, Morocco. Early on 56 athletes were scheduled to represent Namibia in 10 sports. This later grew to 68 athletes in 13 sports. In total two gold medals, two silver medals and four bronze medals were won and the country finished in 16th place in the medal table, shared with Angola. Most medals were won in cycling.

Medal summary

Medal table

|  style="text-align:left; width:78%; vertical-align:top;"|

|  style="text-align:left; width:22%; vertical-align:top;"|

Archery 

Adriaan Paul Grobler and Quinn Reddig competed in archery and they won the silver medal in the mixed team event.

Grobler also competed in the men's individual event and Reddig also competed in the women's individual event.

Athletics 

Namibia competed in athletics.

Chenoult Lionel Coetzee and Gilbert Hainuca competed in the men's 100 metres event. Neither of them qualified to compete in the semifinals.

Jolene Jacobs and Globine Mayova competed in the women's 100 metres event. Jacobs advanced to the semifinals and Mayova did not advance to the semifinals.

Gideon Ernst Narib, Kamuaruuma Sydney and Alexander Mahmad Bock competed in the men's 200 metres event.

Tjipekapora Herunga and Beatrice Masilingi competed in the women's 400 metres event. Herunga qualified in the heats to compete in the semifinals and Masilingi qualified to compete in the final. She finished in 7th place.

Boxing 

Namibia selected eleven boxers to represent the country at the 2019 African Games: At the Games, only eight boxers participated: Gabriel Shigwedha, Trofimus Johannes, Chris Kangorondue didn't step into a ring.

Jonas Junias Jonas won the bronze medal in the men's super lightweight (63 kg) event.

Men

Chess 

Four chess players represented Namibia in chess: Dante Beukes, Charles Eichab, Lishen Mentile and Nicola Veweza Tjaronda.

Cycling 

Namibia competed in road cycling and mountain bike cycling.

Fencing 

Namibia competed in fencing. Johan Pieterse, Jens Pinsenschaum and Connor Strydom competed in the men's Individual Épée event and the Team Épée event.

Karate 

Namibia competed in karate.

Shooting 

Namibia competed in shooting. Ian Kriel, Hendrik Roos and Frans Venter competed in the men's trap event.

Swimming 

Two athletes represented Namibia in swimming.

Men

Women

Tennis
 

Namibia entered four tennis players into the African Games, three men and one woman.

Men

Women

Volleyball 

Kristin Schulz and Kim Seebach represented Namibia in beach volleyball in the women's tournament and they reached the quarterfinals.

Wrestling 

Two athletes represented Namibia in wrestling.

Men's freestyle

Men's Greco-Roman

See also 
 Namibia at the African Games

Notes

References 

Nations at the 2019 African Games
2019
African Games